This is a list of films produced by U.S. independent production company Amblin Entertainment, currently based in Universal City, California and owned by media-entertainment company Amblin Partners, and associated with Universal Pictures. Amblin Entertainment was established in 1980 by filmmaker Steven Spielberg with two producers, Kathleen Kennedy and Frank Marshall.

Films

Released films

Upcoming films 

Note: The films marked with "*" are ones that Spielberg had no involvement with.

Short films 
Tummy Trouble (1989)
Roller Coaster Rabbit (1990)
Trail Mix-Up (1993)
I'm Mad (Animaniacs short) (1994)
Battle at Big Rock (2019)

Direct-to-video 
Tiny Toon Adventures: How I Spent My Vacation (1992)
Wakko's Wish (1999)

References 

Amblin
A